Kelly Higashi (born February 1, 1962) is an associate judge of the Superior Court of the District of Columbia. In February 2018, Higashi was nominated by President Donald Trump to a 15-year term as an associate judge on the Superior Court of the District of Columbia. She was confirmed by the U.S. Senate on July 12, 2018, and her investiture was on October 26, 2018.

Highashi received her Bachelor of Arts from the University of Pennsylvania and her Juris Doctor from the George Washington University Law School. After law school, she clerked for Frederick Weisberg of the Superior Court of the District of Columbia.

Prior to becoming a judge, Higashi served as Chief of the Sex Offense and Domestic Violence Section at the United States Attorney's Office in the District of Columbia. She investigated and tried criminal cases involving domestic violence and sexual assault cases with adult and child victims. Higashi received the Assistant United States Attorneys Association Harold Sullivan Award in 2016. She also received several United States Attorney's Awards for Special Achievement, the United States Attorney's Justice for Victims of Crime Award, and the United States Attorney's Award for Excellence in Management.

See also
List of Asian American jurists

References

External links
 

Living people
21st-century American lawyers
University of Pennsylvania alumni
George Washington University Law School alumni
Lawyers from Los Angeles
1962 births
Judges of the Superior Court of the District of Columbia
21st-century American judges
American jurists of Japanese descent
21st-century American women judges